Ottamuri Velicham (English: Light in the Room) is a 2017 Indian Malayalam-language drama film written and directed by Rahul Riji Nair. It is produced under the banner of First Print Studios and has Vinitha Koshy and Deepak Parambol in the lead roles. The film unveils the journey of a newly wed girl who moves into a one-room shack in an isolated village with her husband. The film portrays the social issue of marital rape in India.
The film won 4 awards at the 2017 Kerala State Film Awards, including Best Feature Film of the year. The film had its World Premiere at the New York Indian Film Festival on May 11, 2018. The film was released on Eros Now as an Original in November, 2018.

Plot 
Set against the backdrop of a hilltop village surrounded by dense forest and a decaying tea plantation, is the story of Sudha, an under privileged woman who reaches this village after her marriage with Chandran. They stay along with Chandran’s brother and aging mother in a confined single room house with a makeshift separation to create space for the couple. The room has a strange light without a switch which changes its colours often. While Chandran calls the light his invention of a lifetime, it deprives Sudha of her privacy and begins to haunt her. Adding to her woes, Chandran engages in acts to physically exert his dominance over Sudha. Amidst deep trauma, Sudha realises that she doesn't have any support and decides to fight for her survival and seeks revenge against Chandran. Will Sudha succeed in her fight for freedom forms the crux of this emotional thriller.

Cast 
Deepak Parambol as Chandran
Vinitha Koshy as Sudha
Rajesh Sharma as Jayan
Pauly Valsan as Mother
Renjit Shekar Nair as Ramesh

Crew 
 Story, Screenplay, Dialogue, Direction: Rahul Riji Nair
 Produced By: First Print Studios
 Executive Producers: Sujith Warrier, Zam Abdul Vahid
 DoP: Luke Jose
 Editor: Appu N Bhattathiri
 Music: Sidhartha Pradeep, Sheron Roy Gomez
 Background Score: Sidhartha Pradeep
 Lyrics: Linku Abraham, Gilu Joseph
 Art: Sidharth Jeevakumar
Assistant Art Directors : Aishwarya Nandkumar, Sreelakshmi A
 Make-Up: Prabhakaran Poojapura
 Sound Design & Mixing: Anoop Kammaran (AK Music Studios), Shefin Mayan, Prasanth Sasidharan
 Costumes: Nithya Vijay, Devika S Nair
 Chief Associate: Jeevan Jos Kaitharath, Baiju V Nath

Awards 
Kerala State Film Awards 2017
 Kerala State Film Award for Best Film : Ottamuri Velicham
 Kerala State Film Award for Best Editor : Appu N Bhattathiri
 Kerala State Film Award for Best Character Actress : Pauly Valsan
 Kerala State Film Award - Special Jury Award : Vinitha Koshy

 International Awards

 German Star of India [Best Feature Film], 15th Indian Film Festival Stuttgart, 2018 
 Second Best Feature Film, Chicago South Asian Film Festival, 2018

 Nominations

 Best Film, New York Indian Film Festival 2018 
 Best Director, New York Indian Film Festival 2018
 Best Actress,  New York Indian Film Festival 2018
 Director's Vision Award, 15th Indian Film Festival Stuttgart, 2018
 Oxfam Award for Best Film on Gender Equality, MAMI 2018

Film festivals 
 Winner, 15th Indian Film Festival Stuttgart
 Runner Up, Chicago South Asian Film Festival
 Official Selection (India Gold), Mumbai Film Festival (MAMI) 
 Official Selection, New York Indian Film Festival 2018 (World Premiere)
 Official Selection, Imagine India International Film Festival, Madrid 2019
 Official Selection, Film Bazaar Recommends 2017
 Official Selection, Market Recommended - Dubai Film Market 2017

Production 
Principal photography commenced in June 2017 in Thiruvananthapuram, Kerala. The major portions of film is set against the backdrop of Bonacaud Tea Estate.

References 

Films about social issues in India
2010s Malayalam-language films
2017 films
Eros Now original films